Selci may refer to:

 Selci, Italy, a municipality in Rieti, Lazio
 Selci, Struga, a village in North Macedonia
 Selci, Bizovac, a village near Bizovac, Osijek-Baranja County, Croatia
 Selci Đakovački, a village in Osijek-Baranja County, Croatia
 Selci Križovljanski, a village near Cestica, Varaždin County, Croatia

See also
 Seltsi (disambiguation)
 Selca (disambiguation)
 Selce (disambiguation)